The 2018 Gibraltar Darts Trophy was the seventh of thirteen PDC European Tour events on the 2018 PDC Pro Tour. The tournament took place at Victoria Stadium, Gibraltar from 8–10 June 2018. It featured a field of 48 players and £135,000 in prize money, with £25,000 going to the winner.

Michael Smith was the defending champion after defeating Mensur Suljović 6–4 in the 2017 final, but he lost 6–5 to Jermaine Wattimena in the second round.

Michael van Gerwen won the title for a third time by defeating Adrian Lewis 8–3 in the final.

Prize money
This is how the prize money is divided:

Prize money will count towards the PDC Order of Merit, the ProTour Order of Merit and the European Tour Order of Merit, with one exception: should a seeded player lose in the second round (last 32), their prize money will not count towards any Orders of Merit, although they still receive the full prize money payment.

Qualification and format 
The top 16 entrants from the PDC ProTour Order of Merit on 11 May will automatically qualify for the event and will be seeded in the second round.

The remaining 32 places will go to players from five qualifying events – 18 from the UK Qualifier (held in Milton Keynes on 18 May), eight from the West/South European Qualifier (held on 30 May), four from the Host Nation Qualifier (held on 7 June), one from the Nordic & Baltic Qualifier (held on 25 May) and one from the East European Qualifier (held on 24 February).

The following players will take part in the tournament:

Top 16
  Michael van Gerwen (champion)
  Michael Smith (second round)
  Peter Wright (quarter-finals)
  Rob Cross (quarter-finals)
  Daryl Gurney (third round)
  Mensur Suljović (second round)
  Joe Cullen (third round)
  Jonny Clayton (quarter-finals)
  Ian White (second round)
  Dave Chisnall (second round)
  James Wade (third round)
  Darren Webster (second round)
  Simon Whitlock (third round)
  Mervyn King (second round)
  Gerwyn Price (quarter-finals)
  Stephen Bunting (second round)

UK Qualifier
  Richie Burnett (first round)
  Andy Boulton (third round)
  James Wilson (first round)
  Adrian Lewis (runner-up)
  Michael Barnard (second round)
  Barrie Bates (first round)
  Adam Huckvale (second round)
  Mark Dudbridge (first round)
  Steve West (semi-finals)
  Jamie Lewis (first round)
  Chris Dobey (third round)
  Robert Thornton (first round)
  Ross Smith (second round)
  Steve Lennon (first round)
  Matt Padgett (first round)
  Brendan Dolan (second round)
  Paul Nicholson (semi-finals)
  Ritchie Edhouse (first round)

West/South European Qualifier
  Jermaine Wattimena (third round)
  Jeffrey de Graaf (first round)
  Toni Alcinas (first round)
  Max Hopp (third round)
  Cristo Reyes (second round)
  Vincent van der Voort (second round)
  Mike De Decker (second round)
  Hannes Schnier (second round)

Host Nation Qualifier
  Antony Lopez (first round)
  Clayton Otton (first round)
  Roy Asquez (first round)
  Tony Dawkins (first round)

Nordic & Baltic Qualifier
  Darius Labanauskas (second round)

East European Qualifier
  Krzysztof Ratajski (first round)

Draw

References

2018 PDC European Tour
2018 in Gibraltarian sport
Darts in Gibraltar
June 2018 sports events in Europe